Mrs. Davis is an upcoming American science fiction drama television series created by Tara Hernandez and Damon Lindelof for Peacock. The series stars Betty Gilpin as a nun using her faith to take on technology. It premiered at South by Southwest (SXSW) on March 11, 2023, before its debut on Peacock on April 20, 2023.

Premise 
Faith and technology are at odds as a nun confronts a power of artificial intelligence.

Cast 
 Betty Gilpin as Simone, a nun battling artificial intelligence
 Jake McDorman as Wiley, an ex-boyfriend of Simone's who stands against the AI with her
 Margo Martindale as Simone's Mother Superior
 Andy McQueen
 Ben Chaplin
 David Arquette
 Elizabeth Marvel
 Chris Diamantopoulos
 Ashley Romans
 Katja Herbers

Episodes

Production 
Mrs. Davis was created by Damon Lindelof and Tara Hernandez at Warner Bros. Television, and the show received a 10-episode series order for Peacock.  The pair would both co-write and executive produce, with Hernandez acting as showrunner.  Susan Rovner had been developing the series with them at Warner Bros., and after leaving for NBCUniversal, she out-bid other broadcasters and streamers to buy the show.  Owen Harris and Alethea Jones are executive producing and will each direct multiple episodes.

Casting began in March 2022, starting with Betty Gilpin in the lead role of a nun battling artificial intelligence, and Jake McDorman starring opposite her. Margo Martindale, Andy McQueen, and Ben Chaplin were added to the main cast, while David Arquette and Elizabeth Marvel received recurring roles. After the start of filming, Chris Diamantopoulos, Ashley Romans, and Katja Herbers were added to the cast as well.

Filming was in progress in August 2022, shooting primarily on the Warner Bros. lot or in a remote desert location to maintain secrecy.

The series had its world premiere at South by Southwest (SXSW) on March 11, 2023. The series is scheduled to be released on April 20, 2023, with the first four episodes available immediately and the rest of the remaining four debuting on a weekly basis.

References

External links 
 

2020s American drama television series
2020s American science fiction television series

English-language television shows
Peacock (streaming service) original programming
Television series about artificial intelligence
Television series about nuns
Television series by Warner Bros. Television Studios
Television series created by Damon Lindelof
Television shows about religion
Television shows about technology
Upcoming drama television series